The following is a list of current governors of the Indonesian provinces.

Indonesia is administratively divided into thirty-nine provinces. The Capital City of Nusantara is headed by a national cabinet ministerial-level authority head appointed directly by the president, concurrently serving as governor for five-year terms independently from cabinet terms, and the province does not have a legislative body. While the Special Region of Yogyakarta has its own legislative body, the province is headed by the Sultan of Yogyakarta who reigns for life (divided into five-year terms for ceremonial purposes). Other provinces have their own local government, headed by a governor, and have their own legislative body. The governors and members of local representative bodies are elected by popular vote for five-year terms.

Current

See also
 Provinces of Indonesia

References

Indonesian governors